Ali Al Haidhani (Arabic:علي الحيضاني) (born 7 January 1998) is an Emirati footballer who plays for Al Dhaid as a right back.

References

External links
 

1998 births
Emirati footballers
Living people
Al Ain FC players
Al Urooba Club players
Dibba Al-Hisn Sports Club players
Al Dhaid SC players
UAE Pro League players
UAE First Division League players
Association football fullbacks
Place of birth missing (living people)